Christianne Jose B. Navato (born September 13, 1996)  is a Filipino actor, dancer and singer under ABS-CBN's Star Magic.

He made his first television appearance at the age of seven ever since joining ABS-CBN's talent search Star Circle Quest: Kids Edition in 2004, where he got in "Magic Circle of 5" and became the fourth placer.

Biography

Early days
CJ Navato was born on September 13, 1996 in the Philippines. He attended Elizabeth Seton School in Las Piñas City during his elementary years. He also had experienced travelling to Germany with his mother and grandmother at a young age. Since childhood, he is known to have talents in dancing, singing, and doing Martial Arts (Taekwondo). Before joining the entertainment world, he had joined spelling and singing contests.

2004: Star Circle Quest
In 2004, Navato joined the reality-based talent competition named Star Circle Quest on ABS-CBN. Together with the other contestants, Navato had undergone talent training, physical enhancement and different challenges to test their talent skills. His reason for joining the said talent show was because he wanted to be an artist, an actor, and to improve his skills and talent. During this period, he admires Robin Padilla, Bong Revilla, Rico Yan, and Kyla. He managed to be in the "Magic Circle of 5" with fellow competitors Nash Aguas, Sharlene San Pedro, Aaron Junatas, and Mikylla Ramirez. During the "Grand Questors Night held in June 2004 in Araneta Coliseum, Navato placed fifth. Since then, he became a part of Star Magic with an exclusive contract with ABS-CBN.

2005: Goin' Bulilit
In February 2005, Navato was cast in the newly-launched sketch comedy gag show, Goin Bulilit, featuring children in various comedic situations. He was a main cast until 2008 where he graduated with Kathryn Bernardo, Steven Fermo, Jane Oineza, and Mikylla Ramirez. The "Fifth Batch Graduates" left because the show is for kids, while they are already growing up older.

2012–2016: Luv U
In February 2012, Navato became a part of the main cast of ABS-CBN's teen comedy series named Luv U. He portrays Boom Enriquez, a teenage school boy who is partnered opposite April Muñoz, portrayed by Angeli Gonzales. After his graduation, it was announced that his father forced Boom to enter the Philippine Military Academy. The show enables the cast to create a real-life friendship as Navato states that they "work as a team".

2021: Your Face Sounds Familiar (season 3)
In 2021, Navato became a part of the third season of Your Face Sounds Familiar, with the moniker The Viral Crooner. He placed 6th in the said season.

Filmography

Movies

Television series

Maalaala Mo Kaya episodes

Reality/Variety shows

Note: Guest appearances in shows are not included.

References

External links 

 

1996 births
Living people
Filipino male television actors
Star Magic
Star Circle Quest participants
Filipino male child actors
Star Music artists
ABS-CBN personalities